Trier Air Base, also known as Trier Euren Airfield, is a former military airfield located in the southwest of Trier, a city in Rhineland-Palatinate, Germany. It was established in 1910. During World War I it was used by the Deutsche Luftstreitkräfte as both a Zeppelin and military airfield. Later, it was used by the Air Service, United States Army, Deutsche Luftwaffe, the United States Army Air Forces, and NATO forces until being closed in 1977, when the airfield was converted into an industrial park.

History
The history of Trier Air Base begins in 1910, when the Berliner Aeroclub held an air race between Trier and Metz. It was the first long range distance, and the first aviation undertaking in the southwest of Germany. It was then unused until 1913 when the German Imperial Army (Deutsches Heer) held  maneuvers on the site, accompanied by an airplane.  Afterwards, it became an intermediate airfield for Zeppelin airships based in Cologne. To facilitate this a large airship hangar was built at the field.

World War I
During the war, it was used as a Zeppelin Airbase. A Zeppelin from Trier bombed Paris on 21 March 1915.  In addition to the Zeppelins, several combat aircraft squadrons of the Luftstreitkräfte (Imperial German Army Air Service) were stationed at Trier Airdrome.

United States Third Army
After the 1918 Armistice with Germany,  the airfield was designated as an occupation area for the United States Third Army Air Service and many German aircraft were surrendered to the Americans there.  

Initially, the Third Army Ait Service VII Corps Observation Group was assigned to the field.  Assigned to it were the  12th and 88th Aero Squadrons (Corps Observation).  Its mission it was to map the Rhineland area using aerial photography and  perform test flights on surrendered German aircraft. Flights of the Fokker D.VII, Pfalz D.XII, Halberstadts and Rumpler aircraft were made and evaluations were provided.

Temporarily, Trier Airfield was the home of Headquarters of Third Army Air Service, which arrived on 8 December 1918.  Assigned to it were the  9th, 91st, 94th and 166th Aero Squadrons.   Its stay at Trier was brief, as it moved to Coblenz Airdrome, Fort Kaiser Alexander, once facilities in Coblenz were prepared.

Other Air Service squadrons at Trier were the 9th and 186th Aero Squadrons, which arrived on 15 April 1919 after the US First and Second Armies in France were demobilized.   The American use of Trier Airfield ended on 12 May 1919 when Headquarters, Third Army ordered all Air Service units in the Rhineland to move back to France for demobilization.

Luftwaffe use in World War II
When the Americans left, the airfield was used by French troops, and German civilian aircraft were not allowed to use it until 1927.  In 1935, in violation of the Treaty of Versailles, the Luftwaffe was brought into existence.  The airfield was reopened by the Nazi Government, but due to its close proximity to the French border, the airfield was used for light non-military aircraft.   In 1938 or 1939, some reserve units of the Luftwaffe were briefly stationed at the airfield, but no combat  units were assigned.

When World War II broke out with France on 3 September 1939, Trier Airfield was placed on alert, but no Luftwaffe aircraft were assigned until May 1940, during the buildup of German forces prior to the Battle of France.  The following known units were assigned to the airfield in May:
 Jagdgeschwader 53 (JG 53), Messerschmitt Bf 109E
 Jagdgeschwader 52 (JG 52), Messerschmitt Bf 109E
 Lehrgeschwader 1 (LG 1), Messerschmitt Bf 110C/D
 Zerstörergeschwader 1 (ZG 1), Messerschmitt Bf 110C/D
 Zerstörergeschwader 76 (ZG 76), Messerschmitt Bf 110C/D
 Kampfgeschwader 2 (KG 2), Dornier Do 17Z

All of these units took part in the ensuring combat in France during May and June 1940, and moving west into France.   By mid-July, all of the combat units had moved out,  and Trier airfield was unused for several years.

Advanced Landing Ground Y-57
As Allied forces moved east from France in late 1944, the airfield was attacked on several occasions by Ninth Air Force B-26 Marauder medium bombers and P-47 Thunderbolts to deny the Luftwaffe use of the facility while the ground forces moved into Germany, crossing the Siegfried Line. The Trier area was the scene of heavy combat between the German Forces and Allies and they pushed east into the Rhineland as part of the Western Allied invasion of Germany. Finally in late February, the American Third Army captured the airfield.

Combat engineers from IX Engineer command moved in with the 825th Engineering Aviation Battalion arriving on 6 March 1945 to repair the damaged airfield.  Pierced Steel Planking was laid down over the damaged concrete runway, making it usable for American combat aircraft.  In addition, the engineers began clearing the airport of mines and destroyed Luftwaffe aircraft, and repairing operational facilities for use by American aircraft. On 10 March the airfield was declared ready for Allied use and was designated as Advanced Landing Ground "Y-57 Trier-Euren".  Trier Airfield was the first operational American airfield in Occupied Germany.

Trier Airfield's primary use by the Americans was for combat resupply and casualty evacuation, being used largely by C-47 Skytrain transports from the day it was opened until the end of the war in May.   It was also used by the Ninth Air Force 10th Reconnaissance Group until early April, flying photo-reconnaissance missions with P-38 Lightnings (F-4) and P-51 Mustangs (F-5).  With the end of the war, Trier Airfield was closed on 10 July 1945.

Postwar/NATO use
When the USAAF closed the airfield in July 1945, occupation forces from the United States Army moved in to garrison the facility.  The airfield became a Displaced Persons camp during 1945 and early 1946, holding civilians from many countries of Europe as the continent slowly recovered from the ravages of war.

United States Army forces moved out of Trier in the late summer of 1945, as French forces moved into the Rhineland as part of their occupation zone of Germany.  With the establishment of NATO in 1949,  Headquarters, Fourth Allied Tactical Air Force (4 ATAF) was established at what became "Trier Air Base" about 1950.  The wartime damaged airfield was repaired as part of the postwar reconstruction, and new buildings for the NATO facility were erected at the base. The NATO facility closed on 30 November 1957 after 4 ATAF was moved to Ramstein Air Base to consolidate command facilities with the USAF. Once NATO left the base, it was used as a civil airport for the city of Trier.  In the early 1970s it became clear the airfield would have to close to allow industrial development. Construction of Trier-Föhren Airport as a replacement airfield for the city of Trier began.

A French army helicopter unit remained at the airport until 1977, when it was closed and converted into an industrial park.  Although the last aviation use of the Trier Air Base airfield ended in 1977, it is still recognizable, both from the air and on the ground. The runway and taxiways are largely intact and have been converted into streets and parking for large trucks. Two buildings of the airfield remain on the west side of the former airfield, although more and more of the runway is being removed and redeveloped.

See also

 Advanced Landing Ground

References

External links

World War II airfields in Germany
Airports established in 1910
Airports in Rhineland-Palatinate
Trier
Defunct airports in Germany